Grancey-sur-Ource (literally Grancey on Ource) is a commune in the Côte-d'Or department in eastern France.

Geography
The village lies on the left bank of the Ource, which flows northwest through the northeastern part of the commune.

Population

See also
Communes of the Côte-d'Or department

References

Communes of Côte-d'Or